Turner Landing is an unincorporated community in Calhoun County, Illinois, United States. Turner Landing is located on the Mississippi River northwest of Batchtown and is in the Gilead Election Precinct.

References

Unincorporated communities in Calhoun County, Illinois
Unincorporated communities in Illinois